Whitby GO Station is a train and bus station in the GO Transit network in Whitby, Ontario, Canada. It is a stop on the Lakeshore East line and was the eastern terminus of the dedicated GO Transit right-of-way until those tracks were extended to Oshawa in 1995. There are connections by GO Bus northward to Port Perry and Beaverton, and local Durham Region Transit routes within Whitby.

Station layout
The station is west of Brock Street on the south side of Highway 401. The main station building and bus terminal are on the north side of the railway with the island train platform between the two GO Train tracks connected by tunnels. Facilities inside the station building include the ticket agent, waiting room, and public washroom. The bus loop is north-east of the building, and the passenger pick-up/drop-off area is directly in front.

There are about three thousand parking spaces available, and carpool parking is permitted. The majority of the parking, including a multi-storey parking structure, is on the south side across the CN freight tracks and can be reached by a pedestrian bridge.

History

The Whitby Junction Station was built by the Grand Trunk Railway in 1903, at the foot of Byron Street near where the current GO Station is. It closed in 1969, and in 1971 the building was moved; first to the north-east corner of Victoria Street and Henry Street for use as an art gallery, and then in 2005 relocated across the street into Whitby Iroquois Park at the north-west corner of the intersection.

The southerly terminus of the Whitby, Port Perry and Lindsay Railway was at the harbour in Whitby, and that line linked with the Grand Trunk Railway a short distance east of the station.

Connecting buses

GO Bus
 81 - Port Perry/Whitby Bus
90 - Lakeshore East Bus
 96 - Oshawa/Finch Express Bus

Durham Region Transit
 302 Baldwin-Brock
 905 Thickson 
 917 Bayly-Consumers 
 392 Whitby

Long-distance buses
 Megabus: Toronto - Montreal

References

External links

GO Transit railway stations
Railway stations in Whitby, Ontario
Railway stations in Canada opened in 1988
1988 establishments in Ontario